The 2015 Missouri Valley Conference men's soccer tournament was the 25th edition of the tournament. It determined the Missouri Valley Conference's automatic berth in the 2015 NCAA Division I Men's Soccer Championship. Southern Illinois University Edwardsville hosted the tournament at Ralph Korte Stadium on the SIUE campus.

The third-seeded Drake Bulldogs won the tournament, besting the top-seeded SIUE Cougars in the championship match. It was Drake's second MVC championship.

Qualification 

The top six teams in the Missouri Valley Conference based on their conference regular season records qualified for the tournament.  The SIUE Cougars, Bradley Braves, Drake Bulldogs, Missouri State Bears, Loyola Chicago Ramblers, and Central Arkansas Bears earned berths in the tournament. Top-seeded SIUE and second-seeded Bradley received first round byes.

Bracket

Schedule

Statistical leaders

Top goalscorers

Top goalkeepers

All-tournament team
2015 Missouri Valley Conference Men's Soccer Tournament MVP— Kyle Whigham, Drake

See also 
 Missouri Valley Conference
 2015 Missouri Valley Conference men's soccer season
 2015 NCAA Division I men's soccer season
 2015 NCAA Division I Men's Soccer Championship

References 

2015